The Castle School is a coeducational secondary school and sixth form with academy status, located in Thornbury, South Gloucestershire, England, which serves the town and the surrounding villages. Pupils from Bristol also attend the school. There are around 1,189,pupils, including 360 in the sixth form.

The main school site on Park Road has seen additions in recent years including the community sports centre, and the Octagon art gallery and classroom. The Gloucester Road buildings approximately half a mile away are primarily used as the sixth form centre, but also house the vocational faculty used by lower years.

Former headmaster Adrian Verwoert was appointed a CBE for services to education in May 2004. Joining the school in 1980, he was appointed as head in 1988. He was succeeded by Melanie Warnes in September 2004. She left in 2014.

History
In 1862, Handel Cossham, a local preacher, built the original village school, a British School, at Gillingstool. Some years later, because of overcrowding, a new infant school building was added adjacent to the original school. In 1952 the school was separated into infants, juniors and seniors and the latter formed the Thornbury County Secondary school. Before this it was an 'all-age' school taking pupils up to age thirteen, known as Thornbury Council School.

In 1962, during the headship of Mr Cliff J. Martin, plans were drawn up for a new building to house the expanding secondary school. Building work started the following year on Park Road, the site used as the school's playing field. In 1965, the building was opened under the new name of The Castle School, which reflected the school's new position adjacent to Thornbury Castle, whilst keeping the same initials (TCS). The official opening ceremony took place in 1966, attended by the Duke of Beaufort, Chancellor at the University of Bristol at the time.

The county infant and junior schools at Gillingstool later formed the Leaze School, which is now known as Gillingstool Primary School.

The school became a comprehensive in 1972, the same year that Thornbury Grammar School moved from its site on Gloucester Road to new buildings in Alveston (also becoming a comprehensive with the new name of Marlwood School). The Castle School took over the Gloucester Road buildings which now form its Sixth Form Centre.

Notable alumni

Joel Dommett, comedian
Matt Kane, actor, writer and director
Joe Morrell, Wales and Bristol City football player
John Robins, comedian
Billy Vunipola, England and Saracens rugby union player
Mako Vunipola, England and Saracens rugby union player

References

External links

School profile
Documentary, featuring The Castle School

Educational institutions established in 1862
Secondary schools in South Gloucestershire District
1862 establishments in England
Academies in South Gloucestershire District
Thornbury, Gloucestershire